George Milton Byse (September 15, 1858 – December 1, 1936) was an American farmer and politician.

Born in Wautoma, Waushara County, Wisconsin, Byse was a farmer and was involved with the creamery company and the  farmers union. He was president of the Waushara County Agricultural Society. Byse served as supervisor and chairman of the Wautoma Town Board and on the board of education. He also served on the Waushara County Board of Supervisors and was chairman of the county board. Byse also served as the Waushara County treasurer and was involved with the Republican Party, In 1915, Byse served in the Wisconsin State Assembly. Byse moved to Neillsville, Wisconsin. He died in Neillsville, Wisconsin.

Notes

External links

1858 births
1936 deaths
People from Neillsville, Wisconsin
People from Wautoma, Wisconsin
Businesspeople from Wisconsin
Farmers from Wisconsin
Wisconsin city council members
Mayors of places in Wisconsin
County supervisors in Wisconsin
School board members in Wisconsin
Republican Party members of the Wisconsin State Assembly